Zhuang Zhou, commonly known as Zhuangzi (literally "Master Zhuang"; also rendered in the Wade–Giles romanization as Chuang Tzu), was an influential Chinese philosopher who lived around the 4th century BCE during the Warring States period, a period of great development in Chinese philosophy, the Hundred Schools of Thought. He is credited with writing—in part or in whole—a work known by his name, the Zhuangzi, which is one of the foundational texts of Taoism.

Life 

The only account of the life of Zhuangzi is a brief sketch in chapter 63 of Sima Qian's Records of the Grand Historian, and most of the information it contains seems to have simply been drawn from anecdotes in the Zhuangzi itself. In Sima's biography, he is described as a minor official from the town of Meng (in modern Anhui) in the state of Song, living in the time of King Hui of Liang and King Xuan of Qi (late fourth century BC). Sima Qian writes that Zhuangzi was especially influenced by Laozi, and that he turned down a job offer from King Wei of Chu, because he valued his personal freedom.

The validity of his existence has been questioned by Russell Kirkland, who asserts that "there is no reliable historical data at all" for Chuang Chou/Zhuangzi, and that "the Chuang-tzu known to us today" is better attributed to its "commentator", the third-century writer Kuo Hsiang.

Writings 

Zhuangzi is traditionally credited as the author of at least part of the work bearing his name, the Zhuangzi. This work, in its current shape consisting of 33 chapters, is traditionally divided into three parts: the first, known as the "Inner Chapters", consists of the first seven chapters; the second, known as the "Outer Chapters", consist of the next 15 chapters; the last, known as the "Mixed Chapters", consist of the remaining 11 chapters. The meaning of these three names is disputed: according to Guo Xiang, the "Inner Chapters" were written by Zhuangzi, the "Outer Chapters" written by his disciples, and the "Mixed Chapters" by other hands; the other interpretation is that the names refer to the origin of the titles of the chapters—the "Inner Chapters" take their titles from phrases inside the chapter, the "Outer Chapters" from the opening words of the chapters, and the "Mixed Chapters" from a mixture of these two sources.

Further study of the text does not provide a clear choice between these alternatives. On the one side, as Martin Palmer points out in the introduction to his translation, two of the three chapters Sima Qian cited in his biography of Zhuangzi, come from the "Outer Chapters" and the third from the "Mixed Chapters". "Neither of these are allowed as authentic Chuang Tzu chapters by certain purists, yet they breathe the very spirit of Chuang Tzu just as much as, for example, the famous 'butterfly passage' of chapter 2."

On the other hand, chapter 33 has been often considered as intrusive, being a survey of the major movements during the "Hundred Schools of Thought" with an emphasis on the philosophy of Hui Shi. Further, A.C. Graham and other critics have subjected the text to a stylistic analysis and identified four strains of thought in the book: a) the ideas of Zhuangzi or his disciples; b) a "primitivist" strain of thinking similar to Laozi in chapters 8-10 and the first half of chapter 11; c) a strain very strongly represented in chapters 28-31 which is attributed to the philosophy of Yang Chu; and d) a fourth strain which may be related to the philosophical school of Huang-Lao. In this spirit, Martin Palmer wrote that "trying to read Chuang Tzu sequentially is a mistake. The text is a collection, not a developing argument."

Zhuangzi was renowned for his brilliant wordplay and use of parables to convey messages. His critiques of Confucian society and historical figures are humorous and at times ironic.

See also
Dream argument
Goblet word
Liezi
Tao Te Ching

Notes

Citations

References
 Ames, Roger T. (1991), 'The Mencian Concept of Ren Xing: Does it Mean Human Nature?' in Chinese Texts and Philosophical Contexts, ed. Henry Rosemont, Jr. LaSalle, Ill.: Open Court Press.
 Ames, Roger T. (1998) ed. Wandering at Ease in the Zhuangzi. Albany: State University of New York Press.
 Bruya, Brian (translator). (2019). Zhuangzi: The Way of Nature. Princeton: Princeton University Press. .
 
 
 Graham A.C,  Chuang-Tzû, the seven inner chapters, Allen & Unwin, London, 1981
 Chuang-tzu: The Inner Chapters and other Writings from the Book of Chuang-tzu (London: Unwin Paperbacks, 1986)
 
 Hansen, Chad (2003). "The Relatively Happy Fish," Asian Philosophy 13:145-164.
Herbjørnsrud, Dag (2018). "A Sea for Fish on Dry Land," the blog of the Journal of History of Ideas.
 
 
  (Google Books)
 Merton, Thomas. (1969). The Way of Chuang Tzu. New York: New Directions.
 
 
 
 
 Waltham, Clae (editor). (1971). Chuang Tzu: Genius of the Absurd. New York: Ace Books.
 
The complete work of Chuang Tzu, Columbia University Press, 1968

External links

 Zhuangzi Bilingual Chinese-English version (James Legge's translation) - Chinese Text Project
 The Zhuangzi "Being Boundless", Complete translation of Zhuangzi by Nina Correa
 Chuang Tzu at Taoism.net, Chuang Tzu's Stories and Teachings - translations by Derek Lin
 Zhuangzi, The Internet Encyclopedia of Philosophy
 Zhuangzi, Stanford Encyclopedia of Philosophy
 Selection from The Zhuangzi, translated by Patricia Ebrey
 Chuang-tzu at Taopage.org
  Zhuang Zi, chapter 1
  Zhuang Zi, chapter 2
 James Legge Complete Translation In English The Legge translation of the complete Chuang Tzu (Zhuangzi) updated
 

360s BC births
280s BC deaths
Year of birth uncertain
Year of death uncertain
4th-century BC Chinese people
4th-century BC Chinese philosophers
3rd-century BC Chinese people
3rd-century BC Chinese philosophers
Metaphysicians
Chinese ethicists
Chinese logicians
Guqin players
People from Bozhou
People whose existence is disputed
Philosophers from Anhui
Philosophers of culture
Philosophers of education
Philosophers of language
Philosophers of logic
Philosophers of science
Political philosophers
Proto-anarchists
Proto-evolutionary biologists
Chinese social commentators
Social philosophers
Taoist immortals
Zhou dynasty philosophers
Zhou dynasty Taoists
4th-century BC religious leaders
3rd-century BC religious leaders